The 2022–23 Richmond Spiders women's basketball team are representing the University of Richmond during the 2022–23 NCAA Division I women's basketball season. The Spiders, led by fourth-year head coach Aaron Roussell, play their home games at the Robins Center and are members of the Atlantic 10 Conference.

Previous season
The Spiders finished the 2021–22 season with a record of 16–14, 7–9 in A-10 play to finish in eighth place. In the A-10 women's tournament, they received a first-round bye before falling to No. 9 seed Davidson in the second round.

Roster

Schedule
Richmond's 2022–23 non-conference schedule featured 13 games, including a pair of games in the Navy Classic in Annapolis, Maryland, and another pair in the Puerto Rico Clasico in San Juan, Puerto Rico.

In the Atlantic 10 portion of the schedule, Richmond was scheduled to play a total of 16 games, including home and away games against VCU and Davidson. In addition, Richmond was scheduled to host George Washington, George Mason, Saint Joseph's, La Salle, Saint Louis, and St. Bonaventure, while the Spiders would travel to Loyola Chicago, Rhode Island, Fordham, Massachusetts, Dayton, and Duquesne. However, the away games at Davidson and Dayton were canceled due to COVID-19 issues in opponents' programs.

The Spiders finished in fifth place in Atlantic 10 play and faced No. 12 seed Dayton in the second round of the A-10 women's tournament, advancing by a score of 71–60. The Spiders defeated No. 4 seed Fordham in the quarterfinals, 70–65, before falling to No. 1 seed Massachusetts in the semifinals, 80–60.

The Spiders were selected to participate in the 2023 WNIT, hosting Penn in the first round in the Spiders' first postseason appearance since the 2014–15 season. The Spiders defeated Penn, 75–52, and advanced to play conference foe Rhode Island in the second round.

|-
!colspan=9 style=| Non-conference regular season

|-
!colspan=9 style=| Atlantic 10 regular season

|-
!colspan=9 style=| Atlantic 10 Tournament

|-
!colspan=9 style=| WNIT

Source:

References

Richmond Spiders women's basketball seasons
Richmond